Sir Sills John Gibbons (1809–1876) was a London merchant and Lord Mayor of London in 1871.

Life
He was born the son of Richard Gibbons of Chatham, Kent and became a hop merchant. He was a member of the Metropolitan Board of Works for the City of London (1868–71). He was elected an Alderman for Castle Baynard ward in 1862 and appointed a Sheriff of London for 1865–66 and Lord Mayor of London for 1871–72.

Gibbons was created a baronet (of Sittingbourne) in 1872. He died bankrupt in Hastings in 1876 and was buried in Hastings cemetery. He had married Ann, the daughter of William Crookes; the baronetcy became extinct on his death.

References

External links
  A picture of him here - original at Guildhall Art Gallery.
  Picture of grave

1809 births
1876 deaths
Members of the Metropolitan Board of Works
Sheriffs of the City of London
19th-century lord mayors of London
19th-century English politicians
Baronets in the Baronetage of the United Kingdom